Parola is an urban area in the municipality of Hattula in Finland. It is located 110 kilometres north of Helsinki. Cities nearby include Hämeenlinna, Tampere, Lahti and Forssa. 

Many Finnish young men know Parola because of their 6 to 12 month period of armed service at Parolannummi, where the Finnish Armoured Brigade is based. A famous local attraction is Parola Tank Museum.

Hattula
Villages in Finland